ŽKK Brod na Savi is Croatian women's basketball club in Slavonski Brod. The headquarters is in Slavonski Brod.

Notable former players
Ana Božić
Mihaela Lazić
Ena Ljubičić
Antonija Božić

External links
Official website
Official page at Facebook
Official page at Twitter
Profile at eurobasket.com

Women's basketball teams in Croatia
Sport in Slavonski Brod
Basketball teams established in 2010